Paul Dojack (April 24, 1914 – November 7, 2007) was a Canadian CFL referee.

He officiated in 546 CFL games including 15 Grey Cup finals.

In 1978, he was inducted as a builder into the Canadian Football Hall of Fame and was inducted into Canada's Sports Hall of Fame in 1995.

The Paul Dojack Youth Centre in Regina, Saskatchewan is named in his honour.

References
 
 
 

1914 births
2007 deaths
Canadian Football Hall of Fame inductees
Canadian football officials
Canadian football people from Winnipeg